The third Whitlam ministry (Labor) was the 49th ministry of the Government of Australia. It was led by the country's 21st Prime Minister, Gough Whitlam. The third Whitlam ministry succeeded the Second Whitlam ministry, which dissolved on 12 June 1974 following the federal election that took place in May. The ministry was replaced by the First Fraser Ministry on 11 November following the dismissal of the Whitlam government by the Governor-General, Sir John Kerr.
  
The order of seniority in the third Whitlam ministry was determined by the order in which members were elected to the Ministry by the Caucus on 10 June 1974, except for the four parliamentary leaders.

As of 26 February 2022, Bill Hayden, Doug McClelland, and Paul Keating are the last surviving members of the third Whitlam ministry.

Ministry

See also
 First Whitlam ministry
 Second Whitlam ministry

Notes

Ministries of Elizabeth II
Whitlam, 3
Australian Labor Party ministries
1974 establishments in Australia
1975 disestablishments in Australia
1975 Australian constitutional crisis
Cabinets established in 1974
Cabinets disestablished in 1975
M